Seid Gayaplè (born June 30, 1967) is a middle distance athlete who competed internationally for Chad

Gayaplè represented Chad at the 1988 Summer Olympics in Seoul, he competed in the 1500 metres where he finished 14th in his heat and therefore did not qualify for the next round.

References

1967 births
Living people
Olympic athletes of Chad
Athletes (track and field) at the 1988 Summer Olympics
Chadian male middle-distance runners